The 2014 Las Vegas Bowl was an American college football bowl game that was played on December 20, 2014, at Sam Boyd Stadium in Whitney, Nevada, in the Las Vegas Valley. The 23rd annual Las Vegas Bowl, it featured the Utah Utes from the Pac-12 Conference against the Colorado State Rams of the Mountain West Conference. It was one of the 2014–15 bowl games that concluded the 2014 FBS football season. The game started at 12:30 p.m. PST and aired on ABC and Sports USA Radio Network. Sponsored by motor oil manufacturer Royal Purple, the game was officially known as the Royal Purple Las Vegas Bowl. Utah beat Colorado State by a score of 45–10.

Teams

This was the 80th overall meeting between these two teams, with Utah leading the series 55–22–2. The last time these two teams met was in 2010.

Game summary

Scoring summary

Source:

Statistics

References

Las Vegas Bowl
Las Vegas Bowl
Utah Utes football bowl games
Colorado State Rams football bowl games
Las Vegas Bowl
Las Vegas Bowl